Backwards Tunnel, also known as the Ogdensburg Railroad Arch, is located in Ogdensburg, Sussex County, New Jersey, United States. The tunnel was added to the National Register of Historic Places on December 28, 2005.

History
The tunnel was built in 1871 by the New Jersey Midland Railway in order to cross the Wallkill Valley. New York, Susquehanna and Western Railway took over control of the tunnel in 1881 when the Midland Railway Line was merged into it. The tunnel was first referenced as the Backwards Tunnel in 1976 because it was thought that the tunnel should have been wider over the road than over the river. Ogdensburg declared the tunnel a borough historic site in 1991. A flood in 2000 which caused two nearby dams to burst damaged the tunnel. A book was published in 2009 about the history of the tunnel.

Design
The tunnel is a double stone arch design and is a 180 feet long. The one arch which Cork Hill Road runs through measures 16 feet wide and 15 feet tall. The other arch which the Wallkill River flows through measures 20 wide and 16 feet tall. The rail line ran on top of the tunnel.

See also
National Register of Historic Places listings in Sussex County, New Jersey
List of bridges on the National Register of Historic Places in New Jersey
Sterling Hill Mining Museum, located nearby the tunnel and also on the National Register of Historic Places.

External links
Wallkill River Watershed.

References

Transportation buildings and structures on the National Register of Historic Places in New Jersey
Tunnels completed in 1871
Transportation buildings and structures in Sussex County, New Jersey
New York, Susquehanna and Western Railway
Road tunnels in New Jersey
National Register of Historic Places in Sussex County, New Jersey
Ogdensburg, New Jersey
New Jersey Register of Historic Places
Road tunnels on the National Register of Historic Places
Water tunnels on the National Register of Historic Places